Alfred Muzzarelli (27 February 1890 – 5 May 1958) was an Austrian operatic bass-baritone.

Life 
Born in Wiener Neustadt the son of a family connected to theatre for generations, Muzzarelli attended the upper secondary school in Wiener Neustadt, where he became a member of the Pennale Fraternity Nibelungia. He studied chemistry in Vienna. During his studies he became a member of the Wiener Burschenschaft Libertas in 1911. He received his musical education at the Wiener Musikakademie. From 1919 until the end of his life, he was engaged at the Wiener Staatsoper. He also performed at the Salzburg Festival for several years.

Muzzarelli died in Schruns at the age of 68.

Further reading 
 Helge Dvorak: Biographisches Lexikon der Deutschen Burschenschaft. Vol. II: Künstler. Winter, Heidelberg 2018, .

References

External links 
 
 
 

Operatic bass-baritones
20th-century Austrian male opera singers
1890 births
1958 deaths
People from Wiener Neustadt